Tower Hamlets is a London Borough, created in 1965. 

Tower Hamlets may also refer to:

Tower division, or Tower Hamlets, a Liberty in Middlesex in East London, abolished in 1900
Tower Hamlets (UK Parliament constituency) 1832–1885
Tower Hamlets, Kent, a location in England
Tower Hamlets F.C., a football club located within the borough